Edmond Brossard (8 July 1900 – 18 July 1991) was a French runner who competed at the 1920 Summer Olympics. He finished fourth and fifth in the 3000 m and cross-country team events, respectively, and failed to reach the final of the 3000 m steeplechase event.

References

1900 births
1991 deaths
French male middle-distance runners
French male steeplechase runners
Olympic athletes of France
Athletes (track and field) at the 1920 Summer Olympics
Olympic cross country runners
20th-century French people